St John's College is an Independent Anglican day and boarding boys' school situated in Houghton Estate in the city of Johannesburg in the Gauteng province of South Africa. It was founded in 1898 and comprises five schools: College, Preparatory, Pre-Preparatory and The Bridge Nursery, as well as a co-educational Sixth Form. St John's College is a member of the ISASA.

History

Early history
St John's College was founded in Johannesburg on 1 August 1898. When Johannesburg was just 12 years old, St John's College was founded by the rector of St Mary's Church, later the cathedral. The founder, Father John Darragh, was from Ireland and a well-known figure in early Johannesburg. The tiny school was housed in Plein Street in downtown Johannesburg. There were seven pupils and only two desks.

Unfortunately the school closed after only two years when the Anglo-Boer War broke out and all the civilians in Johannesburg dashed down to Cape Town for safety. Two years later, in 1902, the school reopened after the peace treaty had been signed and soon 180 pupils were enrolled. The necessary larger premises were found in a wood and zinc building near the Union Grounds.

However, Lord Milner's post-war government actively discouraged private and church schools and again, in 1906, St John's was faced by closure due to falling student numbers. An appeal was made to the Community of the Resurrection, an Anglo-Catholic order of missionary priests and lay brothers to take over the school.

The new Headmaster, Father James Okey Nash, is regarded as our second Founder. His passion to establish a school based on the English public school model led him to pursue a suitable spot to the North of the dusty town of Johannesburg. He chose a magnificent site of 56 acres on Houghton Ridge, and with the help of a generous donation of 5000 pounds made by Sir Thomas Cullinan, the diamond magnate and the land was secured, sold by another benefactor, the Johannesburg Chamber of Industries, for less than half its market value.

The renowned architect Sir Herbert Baker was appointed to design the new school buildings. The first blocks of rough-hewn quartzite were quarried on the site, but subsequently rock was sourced from Krugersdorp. The first school building is the present Prep building, with its original crest over the main entrance. The school is arranged around a number of quadrangles, each with its cloisters. The buildings strongly reminded the CR fathers of their colleges at Oxford and Cambridge. The buildings around David quad were the work of Frank Leonard Fleming, who had worked with Baker.

The first chapel was above the Prep quad, just above the beautiful Della Robbia plaque. The second chapel, at first thatched, was built into the northern koppie, and is now found under the War Memorial Chapel. The Northern view of the chapel is viewed as one of the most beautiful facades in Private School buildings, and forms part of the Red Bus tourist attractions.

Many St John's old boys and masters served, some losing their lives for their country, during World War I, and in 1931 the beautiful War Memorial Chapel, which is the centre of all school activities, was completed to commemorate those who had fallen in battle. The rood screen was created by Italian craftsmen in the 1930s. The pipe organ was built in the gallery in 1964 as a memorial to choirmaster Noel Iverson. Inside the chapel is the All Souls side Chapel, which houses one of only five Delville Wood crosses in the world, as well as the names of those who had fallen during both World Wars carved into the surrounding wood panels. The stained glass windows in the nave are of St John as a young man, and as an elder.

The Bell Tower houses a chiming clock; the only other one of similar size in the country, in the Rissik Street Post Office, is no longer in use. The bells are dedicated to Old Johannian, Terence Moon. The tower overlooks David Quad, named after the statue of David, sculpted by a Florentine sculptor, Verrocchio, which stands proudly in the middle of a cross-shaped pond. David Quad is considered a showpiece of the school.

The Pelican Quadrangle was named after the fountain, which depicts a pelican feeding her young with flesh torn from her own breast, a religious symbol dating from the Middle Ages. The fountain was a gift to the college to commemorate the work of the CR fathers. This image of a pelican feeding her young is an enduring symbol of sacrifice and charity, paying homage to the work of the CR fathers in the college. There is a similar fountain at Corpus Christi College in Oxford and the stone surrounding the fountain was specially imported from Bath, England. The Community of the Resurrection handed over their charge of the school to the Anglican Diocese of Johannesburg in 1934.

Expansion and growth
The Community of the Resurrection relinquished control of the school to the Diocese of Johannesburg in 1934.

In 1935, Rev S.H. Clarke began his two decades as Headmaster. In 1954 Deane Yates became the first lay headmaster. By then there were 664 boys, 375 in the college, 100 boarders in the Prep. During Yates' headship St. John's College has widened in interests and outlook. Boys and masters move towards a broader and more modern concept of education and an appreciation and critical understanding of the rapidly changing life of Johannesburg, of South Africa, and of the world at large.

In 1972, Jan Breitenbach became the first South African Headmaster. Cadet corps ceases to exist. The first female is accepted into Sixth Form. In 1973 at 75 years old the school becomes a three-term school.

In 1977, the first computer on campus was installed in Pelican Quad. 

In 1984, under the guidance of Headmaster Walter Macfarlane (OJ) 17 'legal' versions of the school uniform are whittled down to two: Number Ones and summer khakis. Sixth Form girls are given a uniform. A new school constitution, including the composition of council, becomes effective and lasts until 1998.

In 1994, Macfarlane retires as Headmaster, and Robert Clarence is appointed in his place.

During 1997, Robert Clarence departs as Headmaster. Alan "Takkie" Wilcock replaces him as acting Headmaster, and fully moves into the post the following year.

In 1998, the school celebrated its centenary year. The 100-year celebration was commemorated by a mass of thanksgiving held on Burger Field for all three schools, staff, parents past and present, former pupils and friends of the school. During the year, the school celebrated with a ball, a race day, a golf day, a pageant, an arts and crafts fair, a centenary rose, basketball, cricket, hockey and rugby festivals, and multiple musical and theatrical performances. Commemorative gifts are presented by Jeppe, St Mary's and St Stithian's schools. The celebrations ended with a massed Carols by Candlelight service and fireworks display on Burger Field in November.

The Fred England Technology and Media Centre in the Prep opens in 1999. Sixth Form girls receive boarding. In March 2000, a move to establish St. John's College as a parish is formalised. Te Deum by Péter Louis van Dijk, commissioned for the school's centenary, has its world premiere. The school museum is moved to the armoury with financial assistance given by the Old Johannian Association (OJA). A strategic review is undertaken by council and senior staff which results in the following mission statement: To be a world class Christian school in Africa.

In 2001, the Centenary Venture tops R17 million. St John's College introduces a seventh house: Hodgson, a boarding house. The school has 1234 pupils with an annual budget of R44 million. The synthetic turf hockey field and the sports pavilion linking the hockey and Burger Field are completed. Sixth Form boarding school for girls is expanded with the acquisition of 14 St David Road. St. John's College and St Mary's School jointly sign a lease for Kloofwaters, an outdoor adventure camp in the Magaliesberg. St. John's College hosts three debates during the World Schools Debating Championships. Outreach continues with school support for the Yeoville Community School, Mother Theresa's, educator workshops, the Toy Boyz project.

In 2003, The Bridge Nursery School, a partnership between St. John's College and Roedean School, opens its doors. The actual bridge linking the two schools is constructed over Houghton Drive during the Easter weekend.

Academics 
Today there are five stages to a St John's education:

 The Bridge Nursery School offers two classes for the three to five years old.
 The Pre-Preparatory School is for boys who start Grade 0 at the beginning of the year in which they turn six.
 The Preparatory School is for boys up to the end of Grade 7. 
 The college is for boys, where the main point of entry is at Remove (Standard 6, now Grade 8) typically at the age of 13 (although a few vacancies do become available at other levels from time to time) and boys typically leave at the age of 18.  There is an entrance test, and the applicant's interests and cultural activities, sporting achievements and general demeanour are taken into consideration. A confidential report from the pupil's preparatory school Headmaster/Headmistress is requested. Special consideration is given to siblings, sons of Old Johannians, sons of Clergy and those who come from a disadvantaged background
 The Sixth Form for both boys and girls offers a Sixth Form year to enable students to focus on three subjects of his/her choice in preparation for Cambridge Education International AS and A Level exams.

Test performance
The IEB is a standardized assessment used in South Africa to test quality of schools and education.

Rankings
St John's College was ranked 11th out of the top 100 best high schools in Africa by Africa Almanac in 2003, based upon quality of education, student engagement, strength and activities of alumni, school profile, internet and news visibility.

Campus

The college has eight college houses: Alston, Clarke, Clayton, Fleming, Hill, Hodgson, Nash and Thomson. The school is arranged around a number of quadrangles, each with its cloisters. Frank Leonard Fleming later worked with Baker on certain of the buildings.

The college has two chapels, the War Memorial Chapel and Crypt Chapel. Construction began in 1915 on the Crypt Chapel designed by Fleming as a foundation for the main chapel. The Crypt Chapel seats about 100 students, and is adjacent to the Garden of Remembrance. Each House of the college has a week in which it is to attend the chapel service in the crypt. Above the Crypt Chapel is the Memorial Chapel. The superstructure was completed in June 1924 and dedicated in 1926 to commemorate staff and pupils who fell in battle. Inside the Memorial Chapel is the Delville Wood (All Souls) Memorial Chapel, which houses one of only five Delville Wood crosses in the world, entrusted to the school by the third Regiment South African Infantry. It seats about 500 pupils, including staff, and has a fully functioning pipe organ and a choir gallery at the rear of the chapel above the main entrance. Its pipe organ is the largest of its kind in South Africa.

Sport 
The sports offered at St John's College include: 
 Athletics
 Basketball
 Chess 
 Cricket
 Cross country
 Golf
 Hockey
 Mountain biking 
 Rowing
 Rugby
 Football (soccer) 
 Squash
 Swimming
 Tennis
 Water polo

Notable alumni 

 Craig Williamson, a former South African Police major who was exposed as a spy in 1980, and was involved in a series of state-sponsored overseas bombings, burglaries, kidnappings, assassinations and propaganda during the apartheid era.
 Glenn Babb, former ambassador, politician and consul general of Turkey
 Hugh Lewin, former member of African Resistance Movement, anti-apartheid campaigner, author and founder of the Institute for the Advancement of Journalism;
 John Edmund Kerrich (1903–1985), former professor of Mathematical Statistics at Witwatersrand University, who performed a celebrated series of statistical experiments while interned in Nazi-occupied Denmark in the 1940s;
 Demetri Catrakilis – former Western Province (rugby team) flyhalf and member of the 2012 Currie Cup winning team
 James Gear, Founding Director of the Poliomyelitis Institute and former Director of the South African Institute for Medical Research, internationally renowned medical researcher
 Ian Player, former international conservationist
 Oswald Austin Reid – Victoria Cross recipient 
 Caesar Hull, World War II flying ace
 Eric Rosenthal, historian and author
 Tony Trahar, former CEO of Anglo American 2000–2007
 Clive Rice, Cricketer
 Kai Luke Brümmer, actor
 Gideon Emery, actor
 Sizwe Mpofu-Walsh, author, musician
 Masego 'Maps' Maponyane, TV personality
 Sir Alistair Morton, former Chief Executive of Eurotunnel and chairman of the Strategic Rail Authority
 Tshilidzi Marwala, academic and businessman
 Bruce Mitchell, cricketer
 Siyabulela Xuza, developed a cheaper, greener rocket fuel. Attended Harvard, and is now working with NASA. He has a minor planet named after him.
 Spoek Mathambo, musician
 Kaizer Motaung Junior, football player
 Jack Phipps (1925–2010), British arts administrator
 Kiernan Forbes (AKA), Rap artist, producer
 Chris Froome, British professional road racing cyclist and 2013, 2015, 2016, and 2017 Tour de France winner
 David Hunt, South African rower, Rio 2016 Olympian and U23 World Champion.
 Scott Spedding, former professional rugby player, representing France at a national level after obtaining citizenship at the beginning of 2014.
Steve Boyes, fellow of the National Geographic Society and director of the Wild Bird Trust. 
Abel Selaocoe

Old Johannian Association 
The Old Johannian Association (OJA) is the official St John's College alumni organization. Established in 1903, an elected committee oversees the association and is elected every year at an annual general meeting. This committee meets monthly, and is divided into different specialized sections: finance, administration, reunions, sport and communication.

According to the official OJA website, this association "seeks to provide Old Johannians with social and recreational facilities for the use and benefit of all members." The OJA supports Old Johannian sports teams and maintains a social club for members. The OJA also funds scholarships for students of St John's College.

Events hosted and attended by the OJA include the OJ Annual Dinner, Gaudy Day and annual OJ sports events. Officers within the OJA also organize reunions for Old Johannian members.

Memberships 

 Independent Schools Association of Southern Africa
 Headmasters' and Headmistresses' Conference

See also 

 List of boarding schools

References

External links 

 
 

Anglican schools in South Africa
Schools in Johannesburg
Boarding schools in South Africa
Cambridge schools in South Africa
Private schools in Gauteng
Educational institutions established in 1898
Member schools of the Headmasters' and Headmistresses' Conference
Herbert Baker buildings and structures
1898 establishments in the South African Republic